AAD may refer to:

Organizations 
 Ad Altare Dei, a Boy Scouts of America award
 Advanced Automotive Design, a South African car manufacturer
 Ardent Leisure, an Australian-based leisure company
 AAD Education, Health and Sports (formerly, Athletes Against Drugs), an organization founded by Stedman Graham
 American Academy of Dermatology
 Australian Antarctic Division, which manages Australia's four Antarctic/sub-Antarctic stations, as well as Heard Island

Science and technology 
 Average absolute deviation, a measure of absolute deviation and a way to report error against reference data in statistics
 Advanced Air defence, an anti-ballistic missile in the Indian Ballistic Missile Defence Programme

Aviation 
 Automatic activation device, a fail-safe device often used in a parachute pack
 Adado Airport, airport serving Adado, Somalia (IATA code: AAD)

Computing 
 aad, or "ASCII Adjust before Division", an Intel BCD opcode 
 AAD, the SPARS code for a CD that was recorded analog, mixed analog, and transferred digitally
 Additional authenticated data passed to an "Authenticated Encryption with Associated Data" (AEAD) block cipher mode of operation
 Microsoft Azure active directory

Medicine 
 Antibiotic-associated diarrhea
 7-Aminoactinomycin D (7-AAD), a fluorescent stain for DNA
 Acute aortic dissection, a type of Aortic dissection
 Antiarrhythmic drug, another name for antiarrhythmic agent

Other uses 
 Amal language, a language of Papua New Guinea
 Attitude-toward-the-ad models in marketing is a way of measuring the success of an advertisement
 Africa Aerospace and Defence, an annual trade show in South Africa

See also 
 AD (disambiguation)
 'Ad (disambiguation)